Sohana Saba is a Bangladeshi actress, producer, and screenwriter. She is the recipient of Meril Prothom Alo Awards for her debut film Ayna.

Early life and background

Saba was born and brought up in Dhaka. Sohana Saba completed her SSC and HSC from University Laboratory and Women's college respectively. Afterwards, she completed her bachelor's degree in fashion designing from Shanto-Mariam University of Creative Technology.

Career
Saba is a trained classical dancer from Bulbul Lalitokola Academy and Chayanaut. Her career started as a dancer and eventually entered into TV commercial and drama.

She debuted in film acting by her role in the film Ayna, directed by Kabori Sarwar. She acted in many notable movies which received positive responses namely Khelaghor', Priyotomeshu', Brihonnala, Chandragrohon, etc. She also acted in few Kolkata movies and gained popularity there. Saba is always focusing on doing something different through her acting hence very selective about her work.

She has launched her own production house, Khamarbari, and already produced her very first production Twin Returns for binge.

In 2021, she acted on television series Boli directed by Shankha Dashgupta.

Filmography

Web series
 Boli (2021)

References

External links

Living people
1986 births
People from Dhaka
Bangladeshi film actresses
Bangladeshi television actresses
Actresses in Bengali cinema
Bangladeshi expatriate actresses in India
21st-century Bangladeshi actresses